Akören (literally "white ruins" in Turkish) is a place name and may refer to:

 Akören, Alaca
 Akören, Aladağ, a village in Adana Province, Turkey
 Akören, Aşkale
 Akören, Çankırı
 Akören, Hınıs
 Akören, Kemer
 Akören, Konya, a town and district in Konya Province, Turkey
 Akören, Mengen, a village in Bolu Province, Turkey
 Akören, Merzifon, a village in Amasya Province, Turkey
 Akören, Osmancık
 Akören, Sinanpaşa, a village in Afyonkarahisar Province, Turkey
 Akören, Vezirköprü, a village in Samsun Province, Turkey

See also
 Akörençarşak, Bala
 Akörensöküler, Ulus